The 2017 Aberdeen City Council election took place on 4 May 2017 to elect members of Aberdeen City Council. The election used the 13 wards created as a result of the Local Governance (Scotland) Act 2004, with each ward electing three or four Councillors using the single transferable vote system a form of proportional representation, with a total of 45 Councillors elected, an increase in two members from 2012.

The Scottish National Party won 19 seats, the Scottish Conservatives won 11, Scottish Labour won nine, the Scottish Liberal Democrats won four and there were two independent members. On 11 May, the Lib Dems, ruled out entering into a formal coalition and instead would "consider every issue before the council on its merits on a case-by-case basis."

On 17 May, an agreement was reached to form a coalition between the Tories, Labour and the three independent councillors, up from two after councillor Jennifer Stewart resigned from the Liberal Democrat group to sit as an Independent and give the coalition an overall majority. The coalition agreed by Aberdeen's Labour councillors was without the party executive's approval and so the councillors were told to withdraw from the deal by 5pm on 17 May or face suspension. The deadline passed without any change to the coalition and as such, all 9 Labour councillors were suspended from the party.

In August, the co-leadership was ratified by a meeting of the full council, appointing Douglas Lumsden (Con) & Jenny Laing (Lab) as co-leaders.

Election results

Ward results

Dyce/Bucksburn/Danestone
2012: 2xSNP; 2xLab
2017: 1xCons; 2xSNP; 1XLab
2012–2017 Change:−1 Lab; +1 Cons

Bridge of Don
2012: 2xSNP; 1xIndependent; 1xLab
2017: 1xCons; 2xSNP; 1xIndependent
2012–2017 Change: −1 Lab; +1 Cons

Kingswells/Sheddocksley/Summerhill
2017: 1xLDem; 1xSNP; 1xCons
2012–2017: New ward

 = Sitting Councillors for Kingswells/Sheddocksley Ward.

Northfield/Mastrick North
2017: 2x SNP; 1xLab
2012–2017 Change: New ward

 = Sitting Councillors for Northfield Ward.

Hilton/Woodside/Stockethill
2017: 1x SNP; 1xLab; 1xCons
2012–2017 Change: New ward

 = Sitting Councillors for Hilton/Stockethill ward.

Tillydrone/Seaton/Old Aberdeen
2012: 2xLab; 1xSNP
2017: 2xSNP; 1Lab
2012–2017 Change: −1 Lab; +1 SNP

Midstocket/Rosemount
2012: 1xCons; 1xSNP; 1xLab
2017: 1xCons; 1xSNP; 1xLab
2012–2017 Change: No change

George Street/Harbour
2012: 2xLab; 1xSNP
2017: 2xSNP; 1xLab; 1xCons
2012–2017 Change: +1 Cons; +1 SNP; −1 Lab; 1 extra seat compared to 2012.

Lower Deeside
2012: 1xIndependent; 1xLib Dem; 1xLab
2017: 1xCons; 1xLab; 1xIndependent
2012–2017 Change: − LibDem; +1 Con

Hazlehead/Ashley/Queens Cross
2012 2xLDem; 1xCons; 1xSNP
2017 2xLDem; 1xCons; 1xSNP
2012–2017 Change: No change

Airyhall/Broomhill/Garthdee
2012 1xLib Dem; 1xLab; 1xSNP
2017 1xLib Dem; 1xCons; 1xSNP
2012–2017 Change: −1 Lab; +1 Cons

Torry/Ferryhill
2012: 2xSNP; 1xLab; 1xCons
2017: 2xSNP; 1xLab; 1xCons
2012–2017 Change: No change

Kincorth/Nigg/Cove
2017: 2xSNP; 1xCons; 1xLab
2012–2017 Change: New ward

 = Sitting Councillors for Kincorth/Loirston Ward.
+ = Sitting Councillor for Midstocket/Rosemount Ward.

Changes between 2017 and 2022

‡ Changes of affiliation 
On 17 May 2017, Cllr Jennifer Stewart (Hazlehead/Ashley/Queens Cross) resigned from the Liberal Democrat group and now sits as an Independent.

On the same day, all 9 Labour councillors were suspended from the party and now sit as "Aberdeen Labour".

‡‡ On 10 January 2019 Cllr Alan Donnelly (Torry/Ferryhill) was suspended from membership of the Scottish Conservative Party following a sexual harassment complaint. He remained a member, and Depute Leader, of the Conservative Group on Aberdeen City Council until his conviction for sexual assault on 13 December 2019. He now sits as an Independent but is currently the subject of an interim suspension by the Standards Commission for Scotland.
‡‡‡ On 11 July 2019 Bridge of Don SNP Cllr Sandy Stuart died after a short illness. A by-election was held on 3 October 2019 for two seats. This was due to the resignation of fellow Bridge of Don Cllr Brett Hunt the day after the death of Cllr Stuart. The SNP candidate Jessica Mennie retained the seat for the party.
‡‡‡‡ On 12 July 2019 Conservative Cllr Brett Hunt resigned his seat as he works increasingly overseas. A by-election was held on 3 October 2019 for two seats. This was due to the death of fellow Bridge of Don Cllr Sandy Stuart the day before Cllr Brett Hunt's resignation. The Conservative candidate Sarah Cross retained the seat for the party.
‡‡‡‡‡ On 28 August 2019 Torry and Ferryhill SNP Cllr Catriona McKenzie resigned her seat due to changes in her personal life. A by-election was held on 21 November 2019 and Audrey Nicoll held the seat for the SNP.
‡‡‡‡‡‡ Kincorth/Nigg/Cove SNP Cllr Stephen Flynn was elected MP for Aberdeen South at the 2019 UK General Election. He resigned his Council seat on 4 March 2020 resulting in a by-election. This was scheduled for 5 November 2020 and was held by Miranda Radley for the SNP.

By-elections since 2017

References

Aberdeen city election page

2017
2017 Scottish local elections
21st century in Aberdeen